Mondulkiri (UNGEGN: Môndôlkĭri, ALA-LC: Maṇḍalagirī ; lit. 'Center of Mountains') is a province (khaet) of Cambodia. Bordering the provinces of Kratié to the west, Stung Treng to the northwest, Ratanakiri to the north, and the country of Vietnam to the east and south. It is the most sparsely populated province in the country despite being the largest in land area. The province was established in 1961 from the eastern part of Kratié province. The capital is the town of Senmonorom.

The province's symbol is the kouprey which is also Cambodia's national mammal.

History
In 1960 Mondulkiri was created out of Kratié province by order of King Norodom Sihanouk. Saen Monorom was set up as the capital in 1962. During the Vietnam War in the late 1960s, Mondulkiri was home to three bases of the National Liberation Front of South Vietnam which resulted in numerous incursions and bombings by US forces. About 1970 the area fell under Khmer Rouge domination. Subsequently, much of the populace was forcibly removed to Koh Nhek (Kaoh Nheaek) district to provide labor for rice farming. Schools, hospitals and even entire villages were destroyed. As many as half of the people in the province died during the forced relocation in the 1970s.

The Bunong people appear to have lived in the provincial area for about 2000 years, but there is little documentation until France colonized Cambodia in 1864. Like other people in the province, the Bunong were displaced in the 1970s and only allowed to return to their traditional homeland in the 1980s.

Administrative divisions
The province is subdivided into 4 districts and 1 municipality, which are further subdivided into 17 communes (khum) and 4 quarters (sangkat), and 98 villages.

Geography and environment

It is located in the south-east part of the country and borders three provinces in Vietnam; Đắk Lắk, Đắk Nông, and Bình Phước provinces. Three rivers cross the province; Srepok, Preaek Chhbaar, and Preaek te Rivers.

Waterfalls
Mondulkiri is known for its forested hills and powerful waterfalls. Some waterfalls include:
Bou Sra Waterfall. Located at Pich Chinda District, 43 kilometers from Senmonorom town, Bou Sra (or Busra) is the largest waterfall, made famous by a popular Khmer song in Mondulkiri. It is a three-tiered natural waterfall with only the first two tiers accessible to public view. There is a zipline run by local hotel Mayura Hills Resort that runs over the waterfall.
Senmonorom Waterfall. Five kilometers from town and an easy walk.
Romnea Waterfall. Ten kilometers from Senmonorom, Romnea waterfall is actually 1 of 3 large waterfalls that has now been deforested and privatized.

Protected areas
Mondulkiri faces a significant threat from illegal loggers attempting to exploit the province's virgin tropical seasonal forests. The province holds a number of protected areas including Keo Seima Wildlife Sanctuary, Phnom Prich Wildlife Sanctuary, and Srepok Wildlife Sanctuary, which cover evergreen, semi-evergreen, and dry Dipterocarp forests.

Demographics

Eighty percent of Mondulkiri's population is made up of ten tribal minorities, with the majority of them being Bunong (alternatively spelled Phnong, Punong, or Pnong). The remaining 20 percent are Khmer, Chinese, and Cham Muslims.

Economy and transportation
Road development continues to impact seriously on indigenous communities like the Bunong ethnic group. According to a United Nations paper, the construction of a road from Mondulkiri to Ratanakiri has resulted in massive land grabbing.

Senmonorom is connected to the rest of the province to the south-west, along the border with Vietnam, by National Highway 76 and to the north by Highway 141.

Culture
Although more and more houses are built in 'Khmer style', traditional Bunong houses can still be found. Bunong houses contain large jars (which are said to be more than a thousand years old) and traditional gongs. There are various gongs used at different occasions. Jars and gongs are among the most valuable possessions of indigenous communities both in traditional and spiritual as well as material terms. In the 1970s, during the regime of the Khmer Rouge and Pol Pot those objects were buried in hidden places in the jungle and in many cases still remain unfound.

References

External links 

 
Provinces of Cambodia
States and territories established in 1961